Fear No More is a 1961 American thriller film directed by Bernard Wiesen and starring Mala Powers, Jacques Bergerac and Anna Lee Carroll. It was based on a 1946 novel of the same name by Leslie Edgley.

Plot
Personal secretary Sharon Carlin (Mala Powers) arrives at a railway station on a mission to deliver an important envelope for her boss. When she enters her compartment, a man threatens her with a gun. She sees a woman in the compartment who appears dead. The man knocks Sharon unconscious. When she comes to, she finds herself interrogated by a plainclothes policeman who accuses her of murdering the woman. When they leave the train for the police station, Sharon manages to dodge the detective and, panicked, runs in front of a car which has to swerve to avoid her, injuring a young boy who is a passenger. Sharon begs the driver, Paul Colbert (Jacques Bergerac), a divorced man who is the boy's father and is returning the boy to his mother, to help her. He reluctantly agrees. After a disagreeable scene at the wife's house, Paul drops Sharon back at her home. She has forgotten that her male friend is staying in her flat. Later he phones her and they have a coffee together at a local beat café. When she returns home, she finds her friend dead. Chased by the murderer, she dashes out of the apartment block and Paul drives her away. She eventually discloses to him that she can't go to the police as they won't believe her: she has a mental health history and was once in a sanitorium. The following day, Paul drives her to her employer's house where, inexplicably, his employer and his staff disavow any knowledge of her errand. More worryingly, her employer, Milo Seymour (John Harding) claims a large sum of money has disappeared from his safe, to which only he and she have the combination. Is Sharon the victim of an elaborate plot, or is she veering into madness?

Cast
 Mala Powers as Sharon Carlin 
 Jacques Bergerac as Paul Colbert 
 John Harding as Milo Seymour 
 Helena Nash as Irene Maddox 
 John Baer as Keith Burgess 
 Anna Lee Carroll as Denise Colbert 
 Robert Karnes as Joe Brady 
 Peter Brocco as Steve Cresca 
 Peter Virgo Jr. as Duke Maddox 
 Gregory Irvin as Chris Colbert 
 Emile Hamaty as Train Conductor

References

Bibliography
 Goble, Alan. The Complete Index to Literary Sources in Film. Walter de Gruyter, 1999.

External links

1961 films
American thriller films
1960s thriller films
Astor Pictures films
Films based on American novels
1960s English-language films
1960s American films